The Ghana Library Authority, established in 1950 as the Ghana Library Board, was the first public library service in sub-Saharan Africa. The public library movement in Ghana began in 1928, as a personal effort of the then Anglican Bishop Orfeur Anglionby of Accra. In 1946, the Aglionby Library Management Committee worked with the British Council Advisory Committee towards library development in the then Gold Coast. In 2018, His Excellency President Nana Addo Dankwa Akufo Addo appointed a Ghanaian Social Entrepreneur, Mr Hayford Siaw as GhLA Chief Executive Officer. In May 2021, the Authority was shortlisted for the LBF International Excellence Awards in the 'Library of the Year' Category.

History 
The public library movement in Ghana began in 1928, as a personal effort of the then Anglican Bishop Orfeur Anglionby of Accra who succeeded in building a small library at the Bishop's House with book donated by church members in England for reading and borrowing by the public. The work of the Committee resulted in the passing of the Gold Coast Library Board Ordinance Cap 118, in December, 1949, which became operational on January 1, 1950.

It assumed responsibility for the Anglionby Library, which had been started by John Aglionby, the Anglican bishop of Accra, and the British Council's library service led by Eve Evans.It served as a model for other public library services in Africa. The British Council handed over its Librarian, Miss E. J. A. Evans, and a stock of 27,000 books to start the public library service. This volumes of books were housed in a wing of the King George V Memorial Hall which later became the parliament house for the first, second and third republics. The year 1950 was a significant landmark in the history of public library service in Ghana under the Gold Coast Library Board Ordinance cap 118, which was passed by the legislation council in 1949. The Ordinance was later re-enacted as Ghana Library Board Act 372.

This Act charges Ghana Library Authority to establish, equip, manage and maintain public libraries in Ghana; take all such steps as may be necessary to discharge such functions; and to give effect to the principles and provisions of this act. Aside this function, Ghana Library Authority is to conduct in service training courses, seminars and workshops for school Library Assistants and tutor Librarians; visiting schools periodically to inspect and ensure that employee in these libraries are performing to the required standards; and reorganising school and college libraries and helping institutions interested in setting up libraries in their communities.

Directors
Evelyn Evans was the first Director of Ghana Library Board. The Authority is currently headed by Ghanaian Social Entrepreneur, Hayford Siaw who was appointed by President Nana Addo Dankwa Akufo-Addo

Former directors 

2018 to date - Hayford Siaw
2016 to 2017 - Rebecca Odua Akita
2014 to 2016 - Kwaku Ofosu-Tenkorang
2013 to 2014 - Adjei N. O. Apenten
2011 to 2013 - Omari Mensah Tenkorang
2004 to 2011 - Ekua Techie Menson
2001 to 2003 - Susannah Minyila
1999 to 2000 - Rose B. Bofah
1996 to 1999 - Sarah D. Kanda
1992 to 1996 - Juliana Sackey
1982 to 1992 - David Cornelius
1966 to 1982 - A. G. T. Ofori
1950 to 1965 - Evelyn J. A. Evans

Award 
In May 2021, the Ghana Library Authority was awarded the ‘Library of the Year’ at the London Book Fair (LBF) International Excellence Awards.

Branches
The Anglionby Library was a huge success, therefore a committee was set up. The committee approached the Commonwealth Education and Welfare Trust for money to build more branches especially children's library. The Trust offered £3,000 for the provision of three libraries in Accra. The donated money was used to build the Osu, Accra Central and Kaneshie. In 1975, there was 17 branches across the country. As at 2019, there were 73 public libraries  under Ghana Library Authority.

Greater Accra Region

Accra Central Library 
It shared its premises with the headquarters of the Ghana Library Authority. It was established in 1946 in former Parliament House. The present premises was officially opened on 17 May 1956 by His Excellency the Governor, Sir Charles Arden Clarke, The Prime minister and the President of the British Library Association. The Accra Central Library is located on the High Street, Thorpe Road, in-between the Supreme Court, the GCB Bank, Headquarters.

Tema Municipal Library 
The Tema Branch Library was opened on 9 November 1962 at the Community Centre at Community One in Tema and moved to its current location on 9 January 2003. The library was renovated and reopened in 2019 by Karpowership Company. The library renders lending, reference and ICT services to the public. It goes on outreach to basic schools and renders book box service to some basic schools in the Municipality. It is located at adjacent to the Tema Senior High School.

Dansoman Community Library 
The Dansoman Branch Library was founded in 1984 as a children's Library.  The library is located in the premises of the Dansoman Keep Fit Club. The current building can no longer cater for the population and for that matter, MTN Foundation is constructing a new  library complex for the Dansoman Community to be able to cater for both adult and Children at Ebenezer Senior High School.

Lartebiokorshie Community Library 
The Library started in the last nineties at the residence of Madam Juliana Sackey, former Director of Ghana Library. The current location was opened on 15 May 2013. It was the first library renders service to inmates of the Senior Correctional Centre at Roman Ridge and offers book box services to some schools.  It also runs an  Adolescent health outreach programme in collaboration with the Planned Parenthood Association of Ghana and Mamprobi Polyclinic Adolescent Corner to curb the menace of teenage pregnancy within the community.

Osu Community Library 
The Osu children's Library was opened in 1950. It also organises reading competitions among school children during their long vacation It is located right behind the Osu Commercial Bank in Accra.

Teshie Community Library 
The Teshie branch library started around 1990 in a rented premise at Teshie.  Operations in the current building which was put up the Member of Parliament common fund in 2006 but had a structural defects so the library was closed to the public in 2010. The Ledzokuku Krowor Municipal Assembly (LEKMA) worked on the building until 2015 when most of the defects have been corrected, thereafter was opened again to the general public. The library is located near the Southern Cluster of Schools in Teshie and it is about 100 meters from the Teshie Family Health Hospital.

Dodowa Community Library  
The Dodowa Branch Library was established in November 1961 through the initiative of Messrs.  E. T. Mensah and Johnson.  They applied to the then Director of Ghana Library Board for the facility.  The library was started at Lower Dodowa in a rented apartment on the ground floor of a storey building, under the care of a resident who was later trained to become the Library Assistant in charge. It was later relocated in 1977 to its current place which used to be a clinic.  The facility is currently undergoing renovation by the  Shai-Osudoku District Assembly.
Frafraha Library

George Padmore Research Library on African Affairs 
It was created in 1961 by Dr. Kwame Nkrumah, former President of Ghana. The Research Library was symbolic of what was happening and play important role in furthering the aims of the struggle.
National Children's Library

Volta Region 

 Hohoe Library - 1 July 1958
Keta Branch Library - opened on February 27, 1960.
Agbozume Community Library
Jasikan Library - 1 July 1958
Ho Library
Anloga Library
Kpando Library - 1 July 1958
Peki Library - 1 July 1973
Tsito Library - established in November 1963

Ashanti Region

 Obuasi Municipal Library - 13 October 1969
Ashanti Regional Library - opened as Branch Library in July, 1951 and gained regional library status on 30 June 1954.
Effiduase Library
Konongo/Odumase Library - it was opened in July 1959
Ashtown Library
Bantama Library
Nana Yaw Baah Library, Krofrom
Chirapatre Library
Kumawu Branch Library

Central Region 

 Cape Coast Central Library - gained Regional status on 1 July 1970, but opened as a branch in December 1951
Abura Dunkwa Library - 17 August 1957
Apam Library
Aquarium Library
Elmina Library - It was established in September 1970
Winneba Library
Twifo Praso Library
Dunkwa-On-Offin Library
Ajumako Library

Eastern Region 

Eastern Regional Library
AKim Oda Library - December 13, 1962
Nkawkaw Library - Officially opened on 24 April 1970
Akim Swedru Branch Library
Koforidua Children's Library
Abetifi Branch Library
Asokore Branch Library
Suhyen Branch Library
Apeguso Branch Library
Oyoko Branch Library
Abiriw Branch Library
Jumapo Branch Library
J. B. Danquah Memorial Library - Kibi
Suhum Branch Library
Effiduase Branch Library
Kukurantumi Branch Library

Northern, North-East and Savannah Region 

 Northern Regional Library-was initially established as a Branch in August 1955 (and on August 21, 1964, was elevated and officially commissioned to the status of the Regional library).
Damongo Library - It was opened in April 1959
Gambaga Library - It was opened in August 1968

Bono, Bono East and Ahafo Region 
Bono Region
 Regional Library
Dormaa Library
Sunyani Children's Library - 20 March 1970
Duadaso Library
Wenchi Branch Library

Bono East Region
Techiman Library
Kintampo Library

Ahafo Region
Goaso Library 
Duayaw Nkwanta

Upper East Region 

 Bolgatanga Library
Sandema Library
Bongo Library
Navrongo Library

Western and Western North Region 

 Sekondi Library - it was opened on 19 September 1952 however in July 1955, it became the Western Regional Library.
Takoradi Library
Axim Library - 1 July 1971
Bibiani Library
Sefwi Wiawso Library
Tarkwa Library - 6 July 1956

Upper West Region 

 Wa Library - It was opened in January 1960

Sections 
The objectives of the Ghana Library Authority is to provide materials for educational support, in the areas of both formal or informal education, in order to have a mass of informed citizens in the country and act as a centre for the dissemination of information of any kind and by any means, such as books, newspapers, magazines; to provide facilities for study and research. Additional objectives include active participation in community activities, with the provision of information to fill specific needs, and to promote and encourage a reading culture in the country..These sections were created to fulfill the objectives.

Lending 
The Lending section serves adult and student users.  It provides books for lending to registered users.  It also renders Interlibrary Loans, Reservation, Referral and Current Awareness services.  It observes UN days with exhibitions and displays.  It organizes Outreach Programmes for selected Senior High Schools, Readers Club, Research and French Literacy services to the public.

References 
The Reference section room provided for study and research. It admits only adult and student users.  objective of the Reference Library is to provide the right information to the right person at the right time.  It has sitting capacity of 125. It opens from 9am to 5pm from Monday to Saturday.  It offers current awareness services, selective dissemination of information, interlibrary loan, library orientation and referral services.  Its resources include books, newspapers, periodicals, pamphlets, government publications, laws and historic maps.

Children 
The Children's section offers library services to children especially from pre-school to Junior High school.  Its objective is to promote the reading habit among children and establish the foundation for life-long learning. The library has a reference corner which provides opportunity for children to do their homework.  This corner was equipped with computers to serve the technology needs of children.  The library organizes children's programmes such as story hour, film shows and other literacy related activities. The importance of work with children necessitated the putting up of a summer hut where some of the children's activities like drama and story hour could be shifted to accommodate the growing population of users. The book stock includes reference and African collections.  The library has artefacts, drawings and assorted educational games.

Extension 
The extension section was created in 1960 to cater for the deprive and unserved communities that do not have access to physical libraries.  in view of this,  the Mobile Library Service was introduced.. The Mobile Library complements the efforts of the static libraries by reaching out to clients who cannot visit the library regularly to borrow books to read at home.  It provides lending services through the Book Box Service. This service is particularly suitable for families, institutions/organizations, identifiable groups, societies and clubs. The Mobile Library service is the most popularly acclaimed pro-poor, rural, outreach, public library service programme in Ghana.  The Mobile Library services also embarks on ICT Classes for selected basic schools that do not have computer for their practical lessons in the communities across the country and this initiative is supported by EIFL.

Projects/Activities/Support 

Ghana Library Authority recently launched an e-learning project Read2Skill. The objective of the project is to enable Ghanaians have the opportunity to undertake courses on the world largest open learning platform, Udemy.
GhLA Scholastic.
National Short Story Writing Challenge.
The Ghana National Council of Private Schools (GNACOPS), in collaboration with the Ghana Library Authority (GhLA) and the Parliament of Ghana held "Parliament Reads 2020" under the theme “Inspiring the Next Generation Leaders to be Readers.
Ghana Library Authority declares 2020 as "Year of Learning"
 Library Authority Extends Operations to Abuakwa North Municipality
 Library Authority receives vehicles from government
 Library Authority secures license for 1000 Ghanaians to study on Coursera
 Ghana Library Authority extends services to Jaman North Municipality
 Refurbished Children's’ Library in Sunyani Commissioned
 Eastern Regional Library Launched "Seventy4seventy" Project
 Kyebi Traditional Leaders hand over J.B Danquah Memorial Centre to GhLA
 Ghana Library has established 64 Reading Clubs in the Volta and Oti Regions
 Eastern Regional Library Launched STEM Study Hub
 Ghana Library Authority  Refurbished  Children's Libraries
 Ghana Library Launched Children's Corner in the Northern Region.

Current board members

As of 2021 Governing Board members of the Ghana Library Authority include:

Previous Board Chairpersons

Regional Librarians

 Mr. Alikem Cudjoe Tamakloe - Greater Accra
Mr. Aaron Kuwornu - Northern, North East and Savannah
Madam Elizabeth Arthur - Ashanti
Mr Guy Ebenezer Amarteifio - Volta and Oti 
Mr. Leslie Kansanga - Upper East
Mr. Evans Korletey-Tene  - Eastern
Mr. Augustine Rogatus Votere - Upper West
Mr. Harold Appiah Kubi - Central
Mr. Ofosu Frimpong - Bono, Bono East and Ahafo
Mr. Philip Asamoa - Western and Westen North

See also 

 Ghana Library Association

References

1950 establishments in Gold Coast (British colony)
Libraries in Ghana
Ghana